Polly Scattergood is the self-titled debut album by English singer-songwriter Polly Scattergood, released in the United Kingdom on 9 March 2009 by Mute Records.

Track listing
All songs written by Polly Scattergood.

"I Hate the Way" – 7:07
"Other Too Endless" – 5:14
"Untitled 27" – 3:52
"Please Don't Touch" – 3:48
"I Am Strong" – 3:40
"Unforgiving Arms" – 3:56
"Poem Song" – 6:16
"Bunny Club" – 5:07
"Nitrogen Pink" – 5:04
"Breathe In Breathe Out" – 4:34

iTunes deluxe version bonus videos
"Polly Scattergood" (A Short Film) – 5:13
"Nitrogen Pink" (Treacle Session) – 4:33
"Untitled 27" (Treacle Session) – 3:54
"Please Don't Touch" (Treacle Session) – 3:55

Charts

References

2009 debut albums
Polly Scattergood albums
Albums produced by Daniel Miller (music producer)
Mute Records albums